Crugyreryr is a hamlet in the community of Llandysiliogogo, Ceredigion, Wales, which is 65.9 miles (106 km) from Cardiff and 183.5 miles (295.3 km) from London. Crugyreryr is represented in the Senedd by Elin Jones (Plaid Cymru) and is part of the Ceredigion constituency in the House of Commons.

Etymology 
The name derives from the Welsh: "Eagle's mound".

References

See also 
 List of localities in Wales by population 

Villages in Ceredigion